Sinning may refer to:

The act of committing a sin
A historic district in Oberhausen, Bavaria